Blue Streak is an album by American blues guitarist Luther Allison, released in 1995 by Alligator Records.  Guitar World magazine named it one of the top guitar records of 1995. The album enabled Allison to win five W. C. Handy Awards in 1996, including Contemporary Blues Album for Blue Streak and Blues Song for "Cherry Red Wine".

Track listing
 "All the King's Horses" (Allison, Solberg) – 5:36
 "What Have I Done Wrong?" (Maghett, Magic Sam) – 4:48
 "Big City" (Allison, Solberg) – 5:24
 "Move from the Hood" (Allison, Solberg) – 3:41
 "What's Going On in My Home?" (Allison, Solberg) – 4:06
 "I Believe in Me" (Allison, Solberg) – 4:36
 "Cherry Red Wine" (Allison) – 4:21
 "Walking Papers" (Allison, Solberg) – 4:28
 "Think With Your Heart" (Allison, Allison, Solberg) – 4:57
 "You Don't Know" (Allison, Solberg) – 2:47
 "Should I Wait?" (Allison) – 5:04
 "Midnight Creepster" (Allison) – 3:37

Personnel
Luther Allison – vocals, guitar
James Solberg – guitar
Ernest Williamson – keyboards
Dave Smith – bass
Steve Potts – drums
Mike Vlahakis – keyboards
Ken Faltinson – bass
Robb Stupka – drums
Bruce McCabe – piano
Charlie Bingham – rhythm guitar
The Memphis Horns – horn section
Jacqueline Johnson – background vocals
Jacqueline Reddick – background vocals

Chart positions

References

1995 albums
Luther Allison albums
Alligator Records albums